Agilysys Inc. is a developer and marketer of proprietary enterprise software and other products for the hospitality industry. The company specializes in point of sale, property management, inventory and procurement, document management, workforce management, and mobile and wireless products. Agilysys operates throughout North America, Europe and Asia. It has corporate services located in Alpharetta, Georgia, EMEA headquarters in Windsor, UK, and offices in Singapore, Hong Kong, Malaysia and Chennai covering Asia and the Pacific.

History
The company was founded in Ohio in 1963 as Pioneer-Standard Electronics, Inc., following a merger of Pioneer Electronics Supply of Cleveland and Standard Radio Supply of Dayton. By 1996, it was the sixth-largest supplier of industrial electronics in the United States. It had moved beyond parts distribution to consulting and specialized product development for the computer hardware and software industries.

In 2003, the company changed its name to Agilysys.

See also
 List of S&P 600 companies

References

External links
 Agilysys Website

Software companies based in Georgia (U.S. state)
Technology companies established in 1963
Companies listed on the Nasdaq
1963 establishments in Ohio
Software companies of the United States